The 2023 Tampa mayoral election was held on March 7, 2023, to elect the mayor of Tampa, Florida. The election was officially nonpartisan. Incumbent Democratic mayor Jane Castor ran for re-election to a second term in office. Castor was the only candidate on the ballot, as the only other person who qualified for the race was a write-in candidate.

Castor easily won a second term, receiving more than 80% of the vote.

Candidates

Declared 
 Jane Castor, incumbent mayor (Party affiliation: Democratic)
 Belinda Noah, lawyer and perennial candidate (Party affiliation: Republican) (write-in)

Withdrew 
 Jeff Godsell, personal chef
 Andre Hill Sr.

Declined 
 Bill Carlson, city councilor (ran for re-election)

Results

References

Mayoral elections in Tampa, Florida
2023 Florida elections
Tampa
2020s in Tampa, Florida